Xanthisma spinulosum is a species of flowering plant of the genus Xanthisma native to western North America.

Xanthisma spinulosum grows in dry, sandy hot openings, cooler woodlands, and can be found blooming in the spring, summer, or fall.

References 

Astereae
Flora of North America